Burmese fritters (known as a-kyaw in Burmese) are traditional fritters consisting of vegetables or seafood that have been battered and deep-fried. Assorted fritters are called a-kyaw-sone. Burmese fritters are generally savory, and often use beans and pulses, similar to South Asian vada.

The fritters are eaten mainly at breakfast or as a snack at teatime, served at tea shops and hawker stands alike. They are typically served as standalone snacks dipped in a sour-sweet tamarind-based sauce, or as toppings for common Burmese dishes. Gourd, chickpea and onion fritters are cut into small parts and eaten with mohinga, Myanmar's national dish. These fritters are also eaten with kauk hnyin baung rice and with a Burmese green sauce called chin-saw-gar (ချဉ်စော်ကား) or a-chin-yay (အချဉ်ရည်). Depending on the fritter hawker, the sauce is made from chili sauce diluted with vinegar, water, cilantro, finely diced tomatoes, garlic and onions.

Variations

Diced onions, chickpea, potatoes, a variety of leafy vegetables, brown bean paste, Burmese tofu, chayote, banana and crackling are other popular fritter ingredients. Typical Burmese fritters include:
 Bazun khwet kyaw - fritters made of bean sprouts and prawns, similar to Filipino okoy
 Kawpyan kyaw - fried popiah filled with vegetables such as jicama, carrots, and bean sprouts
Mandalay pe kyaw - kidney bean fritters
 Mat pe kyaw or Mandalay baya kyaw (မန္တလေးဗယာကြော်) - black gram fritters, similar to South Indian medu vada
Mont kat kyaw - vegetable fritters battered in rice flour
Bu thi kyaw - slices of fried bottle gourd
 Kyet thun kyaw - fried shallots or onions, similar to pakora
 Myinkhwa ywet kyaw - fried bouquets of pennywort leaves
Mont hsi kyaw - fried pancake with jaggery slices
Ngaphe kyaw - deep-fried fishcakes made from bronze featherback flesh
 Ngapyaw kyaw - banana fritters, made only with overripe bananas with no added sugar or honey
 Pe kyaw - fried split pea crackers that traditionally garnish mohinga
Pyaungbu kyaw - corn fritters similar to Indonesian bakwang jagung
Samuza - deep-fried potato dumplings
 Tohu kyaw - Burmese tofu fritters
 Yangon baya kyaw - yellow split pea fritters, similar to pakora, falafel and pholourie
 Yikyakway - deep-fried Chinese crullers

Regional adaptations
Egg bhejo or egg bejo ( or ) is a common Indian street snack of Burmese origin, consisting of hardboiled eggs stuffed with fried onions, garlic, coriander, and chilis and seasoned with tamarind and lemon juice. The snack traditionally accompanies khow suey or atho, both of which are adaptations of Burmese noodle salad and ohn no khao swè respectively. The term 'bhejo' is a corruption of Burmese 'pe kyaw', the fried split pea cracker that traditionally accompanies the aforementioned Burmese dishes.

References

See also

 Burmese cuisine
 Fritters

Burmese cuisine
Deep fried foods